Winner Take All is a 1932 American pre-Code drama film directed by Roy Del Ruth and starring James Cagney as a boxer. The film also features a single scene of George Raft conducting a band that had been lifted from Queen of the Nightclubs, an earlier film and lost film.  Cagney and Raft would not make a full-fledged film together until Each Dawn I Die seven years later.

Footage from Cagney's fight scenes would be used 52 years later in Cagney's final performance, the 1984 TV-movie Terrible Joe Moran, which also told the story of a former boxer.

Plot
Rising boxer Jimmy Kane is sent from New York City to the Rosario Ranch and Hot Springs in New Mexico to regain his health after spending too much time with women and drink. There he meets young widow Peggy Harmon and her son Dickie. She eventually falls in love with him, and he likes her too. When Jimmy finds out that she will have to cut short her son's treatment because she will not receive an insurance payout, Jimmy takes on a tough fight in Tijuana to raise the $600 she needs. The marks on his face show Peggy where the money came from.

Jimmy returns to New York. After one fight, he is introduced by Roger Elliot to flighty, flirty socialite Joan Gibson. He soon falls for her, and he mistakes her interest in him as love. When Pop Slavin, Jimmy's manager, arranges for him to fight for the lightweight championship, Jimmy turns it down. Instead, he secretly goes to a plastic surgeon to have his nose and cauliflower ear fixed after Joan remarks that he would almost be handsome if it were not for those features. He gets etiquette lessons from Forbes. When he springs his surprise on Joan, she is not amused. She complains to a friend that he is no longer different and colorful.

Jimmy has Pop set up fights with lesser foes. He changes his style, boxing rather than punching, to avoid risking damage to his new face. The fans boo him. Meanwhile, Pop sends for Peggy. Jimmy has to tell her that he is seeing someone else.

Joan's butler tells Jimmy that she is not home, but he bursts in on her party. He tells her that he will fight one last time, for the championship, after which - win or lose - they will get married. He sends her ringside tickets.

The night of the fight, Jimmy is concerned when he does not see Joan there. He sends Rosebud to call and find out where she is. After one round, in which Jimmy once again avoids contact, Rosebud reports that Joan is leaving on an ocean liner in about twenty minutes. Jimmy attacks furiously and knocks out the champion. Then he takes a taxi to the pier. When he finds Joan, she lies and tells him that her sister needs her, but when Roger Elliot enters the cabin, it all becomes clear. Jimmy punches Roger and kicks Joan when she bends over Roger's unconscious body. Jimmy then proposes to Peggy.

Cast

James Cagney as Jimmy Kane
Marian Nixon as Peggy Harmon
Guy Kibbee as Pop Slavin
Dickie Moore as Dickie Harmon
Virginia Bruce as Joan Gibson
Alan Mowbray as Forbes
Esther Howard as Ann
Clarence Muse as Rosebud, Jimmy's trainer
Clarence Wilson as Ben Isaacs
Ralf Harolde as Legs Davis, diamond ring seller
John Roche as Roger Elliot
Texas Guinan as herself (clip from Queen of the Night Clubs)
Gabby Hayes as Intern at Rosario Ranch (uncredited)
George Raft as a bandleader (clip from Queen of the Night Clubs)

References

External links

1932 romantic drama films
1930s sports drama films
American boxing films
American romantic drama films
American black-and-white films
1930s English-language films
Films directed by Roy Del Ruth
Films set in New York City
Films with screenplays by Robert Lord (screenwriter)
1932 films
American sports drama films
Warner Bros. films
1930s American films